Tim Aeby (born 27 April 1987) is a French music producer, songwriter. He has worked with Claydee, Lexy Panterra, Jenn Morel, Bang La Decks, Cammora, and many other artists. The song "Claydee feat. Lexy Panterra - Dame Dame", his most notable work so far received more than 28.000.000 views on YouTube within the first 6 months after its release. He produces mainly pop, dance and urban music.

Personal work 

In the past, Tim has released multiple songs under his aliases Enzo Darren, Cosmow and D3nch. He got support from artists such as Nicky Romero, Tiesto, Knife Party, Ferry Corsten

He created his own label Thp Music in 2011. After a 6-year run with his company he decided to focus solely on his career as a producer.

Producer and songwriter credits

References

External links
 Tim Aeby on Discogs
 Tim Aeby on Genius
 Tim Aeby Official website

1987 births
Living people
French record producers
French male songwriters